The following list includes notable people who were born or have lived in Bangor, Maine.

Architects and engineers 

 Charles G. Bryant (1803–1858), Maine's first architect, lived and practiced in Bangor in the 1830s and designed Mount Hope Cemetery, the second garden cemetery in the United States.  Bryant later moved to Texas (Galveston) and became the first architect in that state, where, joining the Texas Rangers, he was eventually killed and scalped by Apache Indians. Other prominent Bangor architects, many of whose buildings survive in the city and nearby towns, included Calvin Ryder, Benjamin S. Deane, George W. Orff, C. Parker Crowell, and Wilfred E. Mansur.
 Francis Clergue, born in neighboring Brewer, was a lawyer. He oversaw one of the most ambitious engineering projects in North America, the development of Sault Ste. Marie, Michigan and Ontario as a major hydropower and industrial center in the 1890s–1900s. Before that Clergue had organized the Bangor Street Railway (the first electric railway in Maine) and the Bangor Waterworks, and had tried and failed to build a railroad across Persia and a waterworks in its capital, Tehran.
 Charles Davis Jameson, engineer who taught at MIT. He subsequently went to China and became Chief Consulting Engineer and Architect to the Imperial Chinese Government (1895–1918). He planned important hydraulics projects and witnessed the Boxer Rebellion
 Edward Austin Kent (1854–1912), leading architect in Buffalo, New York, and three-time president of the American Institute of Architects. He perished aboard the RMS Titanic  when the ship struck an iceberg and sank on April 15, 1912.

Artists 

 Waldo Peirce, painter and bohemian. He was a confidante of Ernest Hemingway and was from a prominent Bangor family.
 Jeremiah Pearson Hardy (1800–1887), portrait painter. He apprenticed under Samuel Morse, lived and worked in Bangor for most of his career, sustained largely by the patronage of lumber barons. His children Anna Eliza Hardy and Francis Willard Hardy, and sister Mary Ann Hardy, were also part of a 19th-century circle of Bangor painters. Other members of this circle included Florence Whitney Jennison and Isabel Graham Eaton, who was also an author.
 Walter Franklin Lansil, studied first under Hardy, and then at the Académie Julian in Paris. He established a studio in Boston and became a celebrated landscape and marine artist.
 Frederic Porter Vinton (1846–1911), left Bangor at age 14 for Boston, where he became that city's most sought-after portrait painter—producing over 300 canvases—and one of the original members of the Boston School. He studied in Munich and with Leon Bonnat in Paris, as well as with William Morris Hunt.
 Helena Wood Smith (1865–1914), member of the artists' colony at Carmel-by-the-Sea, California, was murdered there by her lover, Japanese photographer George Kodani. She was the sister of novelist Ruel Perley Smith.
 Echo Eggebrecht, painter from New York, also a Bangor native.

Athletes 

 Brian Butterfield, Boston Red Sox third base coach was born in Bangor
 Norman Cahners of Bangor qualified for the 1936 Olympic Team trials in track & field, but boycotted the event with Harvard track teammate Milton Green, because the games were to take place in Nazi Germany. Cahners and Green were Jewish. Cahners is a member of the Harvard Varsity Athletic Club Hall of Fame.  He went on to build one of the largest publishing empires in America
 Adam Craig, cross-country biking champion was born in Bangor and grew up in nearby Corinth, Maine. He was a member of the U.S. Biking Team at the 2008 Beijing Olympic Games
 Marcus Davis, professional mixed martial arts (MMA) fighter and his Team Irish currently call Bangor their home
 Jon DiSalvatore, of the National Hockey League (now with the Minnesota Wild)
 Mary Freeman, Bangor-born swimmer; competed in the 1952 Summer Olympics in Helsinki, Finland. She later became the sister-in-law of Grace Kelly
 Al Harris (born 1956), former National Football League player of the Chicago Bears and Philadelphia Eagles comes from Bangor
 Emily Kagan (born 1981), American mixed martial artist
 Matt Kinney, Major League Baseball player of the Minnesota Twins, Milwaukee Brewers, Kansas City Royals and now Japan's Seibu Lions
 Jack Leggett, Clemson University baseball coach
 Kevin Mahaney of Bangor won a silver medal in sailing at the 1992 Barcelona Olympic Games, and went on to reach the finals of the America's Cup trials with his Bangor-based PACT-95 team
 Jack McAuliffe, World Lightweight Boxing Champion in the 1880s–1890s and known as "The Napoleon of the Ring", learned to fight growing up as a child in a tough Bangor neighborhood.  He retired with an unbeaten record.  Another local boxer, Michael Daley, became Lightweight Boxing Champion of New England, but was arrested in Bangor in 1903 for robbing a man at a local hotel
 Bobby Messenger, former Major League Baseball player (1901–1964) of the Chicago White Sox and St. Louis Browns
 Matthew Mulligan, of the New England Patriots was born in Bangor
 Pat O'Connell (1861–1943) of the Baltimore Orioles
 Harry Orman Robinson, In the 1890s Robinson was Head Coach of the University of Texas football team, the Texas Longhorns, and before that the University of Missouri team, the Missouri Tigers. In the same decade, Bangor-born Frank Barbour was Head Coach of the University of Michigan team, the Michigan Wolverines, after playing as quarterback of the national champion Yale University team of 1891
 Jack Sharrott (1869–1927) of the New York Giants and Philadelphia Phillies
 Matt Stairs, Philadelphia Phillies hitter; (though Stairs is a native of New Brunswick, Canada)
 Jeff Turner, former National Basketball Association player of the New Jersey Nets and Orlando Magic was born in Bangor. He also won a gold medal at the 1984 Los Angeles Olympic Games as a member of the U.S. Basketball Team

Authors 

 Mabel Fuller Blodgett, wrote the novel At the Queen's Mercy when she was 19 years old
 Laura Curtis Bullard, whose family started a successful patent medicine business in Bangor in the 1830s, eventually moved to Brooklyn and became a proto-feminist novelist and editor. She was a patron and confidante of Susan B. Anthony and Elizabeth Cady Stanton and took over editorship of their newspaper The Revolution when it experienced financial difficulties
 Frederick H. Costello (1851–1921), nationally successful writer of adventure novels for young adults, who for 30 years held a day-job as local (Bangor) manager of the R.G. Dunn credit reporting company
 Owen Davis (1874–1956), Pulitzer Prize winning playwright; lived in Bangor until he was 15, and his prize-winning play Icebound (1923) is set in neighboring Veazie. Davis wrote between 200 and 300 plays, as well as radio and film scripts, and two autobiographies. He was inducted into the American Academy of Arts and Letters, and was president of the Author's League of America and the American Dramatist's Guild
 Henry Payson Dowst (1872–1921), Bangor-born; was a novelist and short-story writer, and saw a number of his stories made into silent films. One was The Dancin' Fool (1920) starring Wallace Reid. He spent his later life in a New York advertising agency, but was buried in Bangor
 Katya Alpert Gilden (1919–1991) of Bangor co-authored with her husband Bert Gilden the best-selling 1965 novel Hurry Sundown, which became an Otto Preminger film in 1967
 Clarine Coffin Grenfell (1910–2004), poet and author, was born and raised in Bangor
 Frederic Henry Hedge, Bangor had strong links to Transcendentalism through Hedge, minister of the Congregational Church there in the 1830s. His circle, which included Ralph Waldo Emerson and Henry David Thoreau, met as "Hedge's Club" or the Transcendental Club whenever Hedge returned to his native Cambridge, Massachusetts. Emerson had previously lectured in Bangor and Hedge took the position here on his advice.  Thoreau visited Bangor a number of times (his aunt and cousins also lived here) and describes the city in his book The Maine Woods.
 Blanche Willis Howard, best-selling late 19th-century novelist, was born and raised in Bangor. She eventually moved to Stuttgart, Germany, and married the court physician to King Charles I of Württemberg, thus becoming the Baroness von Teuffel
 Stephen King, the author best known for his horror-themed stories, novels, and movies. His wife, Tabitha Spruce-King, is also a writer, as are sons Joseph Hillstrom King (aka Joe Hill) and Owen King. The family donates a substantial amount of money to local libraries and hospitals and has funded a baseball stadium, Mansfield Stadium (home to the Senior League World Series), and the Beth Pancoe Aquatic Center, both on the grounds of Hayford Park, for the citizens (especially the children) of the city. King's fictional town, Derry, Maine, shares many points of correspondence with Bangor—the rivers, the Paul Bunyan Statue, the Thomas Hill Standpipe, the hospital—but is always referred to as separate from Bangor. King also features Bangor in many of his stories, such as The Langoliers and Storm of the Century. King owns radio stations WKIT, WZON, and WZLO
 Helen Maud Merrill (pen name, Samantha Spriggins; 1865–1943), litterateur and poet
 Hayford Peirce, science-fiction writer and nephew of Waldo Peirce, is likewise a Bangor native, as is sci-fi author and cartoonist Alexis A. Gilliland. Other contemporary authors from Bangor include novelists Mameve Medwed, Tim Sullivan, Don J. Snyder, Christina Baker Kline, Christopher Willard; poet David Baker, and children's book authors Susan Lubner and Bruce McMillan.
 Eugene T. Sawyer, the "Prince of Dime Novelists", was born and raised in Bangor. In a 1902 interview, he claimed to have authored 75 examples of that genre, mostly for the Nick Carter series, once producing a 60,000 word novel in two days. His major innovation was to "begin the plot with the first word", i.e. "We will have the money, or she shall die!"
 Ruel Perley Smith (1869–1937), born in Bangor, author of the Rival Campers series of boy's book in the early 20th century. His regular job was as Night and Sunday Editor of the New York World newspaper
 Tim Sullivan, science fiction author, was born and raised in Bangor
 George Savary Wasson, painter and author of four novels, lived and worked in Bangor in the early 20th century
 Christine Goutiere Weston (1904–1989), author of ten novels, more than thirty short stories, and two non-fiction books (about Ceylon and Afghanistan), lived the latter part of her life in Bangor. She had been born in India and much of her fiction was set there.

Civil servants

 William Hammatt Davis, of Bangor, brother of playwright Owen Davis, served as Chairman of the War Labor Board under Franklin Roosevelt, where his job was keeping industrial peace between management and labor. He was appointed US Economic Stabilizer at the end of the war. He also helped draft the National Labor Relations Act (the Wagner Act) of 1935, which gave labor unions the right to organize
 Jay Stone, of Bangor was Chief Clerk of the War Department in the 1920s
 Artemus E. Weatherbee (died 1995), of Bangor was an Assistant Secretary of the Treasury (1959–1970) and thereafter U.S. Director of the Asian Development Bank with the rank of Ambassador

Clergymen and missionaries

 Jehudi Ashmun, professor and director of the Bangor Theological Seminary which produced a number of influential ministers, missionaries, and scholars in the 19th century. Ashman later led a group of 32 freed slaves to the American Colonization Society's African colony in Liberia in 1822, and is considered one of the founders of that nation Cyrus Hamlin, who graduated from the seminary in 1837, was the founder and first president of Robert College in Istanbul, Turkey, and later president of Middlebury College (1880–85) in Vermont. Seminarian Daniel Dole (1808–78) left Bangor in 1839 to establish one of the earliest Protestant missions in Hawaii, and ended up founding a local dynasty. His son Sanford B. Dole led the successful coup d'état against the Kingdom of Hawaii in 1893, becoming the first and only President of the Republic of Hawaii and, later, the first American territorial governor. Daniel's nephew James Drummond Dole became the "Pineapple King"
 John Bapst (1815–1887), a Swiss-born member of the Jesuit order, was sent to Old Town, Maine in the late 1840s to minister to the Catholic Penobscot tribe.  Soon he was conducting a roving ministry to 33 Maine towns, largely as a result of Irish-Catholic immigration.  In 1851 he was embroiled in a religious controversy over grammar school education in Ellsworth, Maine, and was brutalized, robbed, and tarred and feathered by a Protestant mob, inspired by the Know-Nothing Party, which was popular in coastal Maine.  He fled to Bangor, where a large Irish-Catholic community was gathering, and where members of the local elite presented him with a new watch, his previous one having been stolen in Ellsworth.  Bapst stayed in Bangor until 1859, overseeing the construction of the large brick St. John's Catholic Church in 1855. He left in 1860 to become the first rector of Boston College. Later he became superintendent of the Jesuit order in New York and Canada, and died in Baltimore, Maryland. The present John Bapst Memorial High School in Bangor, formerly Catholic but now non-sectarian, is named for him
 Joseph Osgood Barrett (1823–1898), born in Bangor, was a Universalist minister who became a prominent spiritualist and spirit medium in Illinois and Wisconsin.  He was also a lecturer and author of books on spiritualism, and editor of the Chicago-based newspaper The Spiritual Republic. He became known as an advocate of women's rights with the publication of his book Social Freedom; Marriage: As It Is and As It Should Be in 1873
 Dana W. Bartlett, of Bangor moved to Los Angeles in 1896, founded a settlement house (the Bethlehem Institute) and became a major figure in the local progressive and City Beautiful movements. He is an honoree in the California Social Work Hall of Distinction
 Elisabeth Anthony Dexter, was European director of the Unitarian Service Committee during World War II, running a programme in neutral Lisbon, Portugal to assist Jewish refugees from Nazi-occupied Europe
 Edward C. O'Leary was Bishop born in Bangor, of the Catholic Diocese of Maine in the 1970s–1980s
 Benjamin Franklin Tefft, Methodist Minister that became president of Genesee College in New York (the nucleus of the later Syracuse University), and, in 1862, U.S. Consul in Stockholm and acting Minister (Ambassador) to Sweden Congregational minister and Bangor Theological Seminary professor John Russell Herrick later became president of Pacific University in Oregon (1880–83), and the University of South Dakota (1885–87). Rev. Charles Carroll Everett, pastor of the Bangor Unitarian Church 1859–69, Tlater became a noted philosopher of religion and dean of the Harvard Divinity School

Defendants and detainees 

 Prescott Freese Dennett, of Bangor was one of 30 people indicted for sedition and tried in Washington in 1944.  Dennett stood accused of helping a German agent, George Sylvester Viereck, distribute propaganda designed to keep the U.S. out of the war in Europe. The case ended in a mistrial
 Howard E. Penley, of Bangor and Dorchester, Massachusetts, was arrested and arraigned in Bangor on Dec. 23, 1943, for refusing to register for the draft.  He was the New England District Secretary of the Socialist Party of America and was opposed to war on political and religious grounds

Diplomats 

 Elisha Hunt Allen, Bangor politician; served as U.S. Consul to the Kingdom of Hawaii 1850–1856, and then joined the Hawaiian government as Chancellor and Chief Justice 1857–1876. In that capacity he accompanied King Kalakaua on his first and only trip to the United States in 1874. Allen returned to Washington as Ambassador of the Kingdom of Hawaii to the United States, and died on the job during a White House diplomatic reception in 1883. Allen's son, William Fessenden Allen, who was born in Bangor, also served in the government of Hawaii, both before and after the Kingdom became an American territory
 Patrick Duddy, of Bangor was the U.S. Ambassador to Venezuela in the Bush administration. He was temporarily expelled from the country in 2008 by President Hugo Chávez in a dispute over an alleged American coup plot
 Albert G. Jewett, U.S. Chargé d'affaires to Peru (1845–1847)
 Edward Kent, former Maine Governor; was U.S. Consul in Rio de Janeiro 1849–1853, he lost two of his three children to yellow fever. His wife died the year they returned to Bangor, and his surviving child soon after
 Wyman Bradbury Seavy Moor, U.S. Consul-General to Canada (1857–1861)
 Robert Newbegin II, U.S. Ambassador to Honduras (1958) and Haiti (1960–1961)
 Chester E. Norris, U.S. Ambassador to Equatorial Guinea (1988–1991)
 Gorham Parks, U.S. Consul in Rio de Janeiro (1845–1849)
 William P. Snow, U.S. Ambassador to Burma (1959–1961) and Paraguay (1961–1967)
 Charles Stetson, U.S. Ambassador to Bulgaria (1921–1928); Romania (1928), and Yugoslavia (1933)
 Aaron Young Jr., U.S. Consul in Rio Grande do Sul, Brazil (1863–1873), who was formerly Maine's State Botanist and Secretary of the Bangor Natural History Society. Hannibal Hamlin, Lincoln's Vice President and Bangor politician, served as U.S. Ambassador to Spain later in his career

Inventors 

 Melville Sewell Bagley, invented an aperitif named Hesperidina, using the peels of bitter oranges, which became the national liquor of Argentina. It is still produced, with his image on every bottle
 John B. Curtis, commercial Chewing gum was invented in Bangor in 1848 by Curtis. Curtis marketed his product as "State of Maine Pure Spruce Gum". He later opened a successful gum factory in Portland, Maine. Coincidentally, Bangor-born Frank Barbour, who became a director (and later Chairman of the Board) of the Beech-Nut Packing Company, would launch that company's famous chewing gum line in 1910

 Chuck Peddle, who developed the MOS 6502 microprocessor in 1975, was born in Bangor in 1937
 Paul E. Watson, of Bangor, chief engineer of the U.S. Army Signal Corps, headed the team that built the army's first long-range radar in 1936–1937. This was the radar deployed in Hawaii at the time of the Pearl Harbor Attack. The Army's radar laboratory was named "Watson Laboratories" after his death, and became the kernal of the present USAF Rome Laboratory

Journalists 

 Margherita Arlina Hamm, spent part of her childhood in Bangor, was a pioneering female journalist who covered the Sino-Japanese War and Spanish–American War for New York newspapers, sometimes from the front lines. She was also a prolific author of popular non-fiction books. A suffragette, she was nonetheless a defender of American imperialism, chairing the pro-war "Woman's Congress of Patriotism and Independence" and writing an heroic biography of Admiral George Dewey
 Ralph W. 'Bud' Leavitt Jr. longtime columnist and editor for The Bangor Daily News. Born in Old Town, Maine, Leavitt became a cub reporter at The Bangor Daily Commercial at age 17 in 1934. Following the Second World War, Leavitt signed on with The News, where he filed, during the course of his career, 13,104 columns devoted to the outdoors, and where he served for many years as executive sports editor. Leavitt also hosted two long-running TV shows about the outdoors on Maine television
 Kate Snow, born in Bangor on June 10, 1969

Judges 

 Edward Matthew Curran, who served as Chief Judge of the United States District Court for the District of Columbia (1966–1971) was born in Bangor. As a Federal judge in 1949 he presided over the treason trial of Mildred Gillars (aka Axis Sally), who was coincidentally born in Portland
 Melville Weston Fuller, Chief Justice of the U.S. Supreme Court (who served 1888–1910) read law in Bangor with his two uncles after graduating from Bowdoin College in 1853. He was admitted to the bar in Bangor in 1855
 Edward Kent Jr., son of Bangor Mayor, Maine Governor, and Maine Supreme Judicial Court Justice Edward Kent, was appointed by his Harvard classmate Theodore Roosevelt as Chief Justice of the Arizona Territory Supreme Court, 1902–1912. He delivered a landmark ruling on water rights (the Kent Decree of 1910)
 Robert Murray served as First District Judge and state legislator

Physicians and nurses 

 Charlotte Blake Brown (1846–1904), pioneering female physician who co-founded what became Children's Hospital of San Francisco in 1878, with an all-female staff and board of directors. In 1880 she also founded the first nursing school in the American West. Children's Hospital merged with another institution to become California Pacific Medical Center in 1991
 Elliott Carr Cutler (1888–1947), son of a Bangor lumber merchant, became Chairman of the Dept. of Surgery at Harvard Medical School and a pioneer in cardiac surgery, inventing a number of important techniques and publishing over 200 papers. He was elected President of the American Surgical Association, and later became surgeon-in-chief at Brigham Hospital in Boston. During the Second World War he was Chief Surgical Consultant in the European Theatre of Operations with the rank of Brigadier General. Another Bangor-born Harvard Medical School professor, Frederick T. Lord, was a pioneer in the use of serum to treat pneumonia, and was elected President of the American Association of Thoracic Surgery
 Harrison J. Hunt, surgeon on the Crocker Land Expedition to the Arctic in 1913–1917, and the first to return to civilization with news of his fellow explorers, who had been trapped in the ice for four years. Hunt escaped after a grueling four-month dog-sled journey accompanied by six Inuit. He spent the rest of his career working at the Eastern Maine Hospital in Bangor, and authored the book North to the Horizon: Arctic Doctor and Hunter, 1913–1917 (Camden, Me: 1930). He is credited with finding the major biological specimens returned by the expedition—eggs of the red knot, which established its migration pattern between Europe and northern Greenland
 Georgia Nevins (1864–1957), nurse, nurse educator, hospital administrator, American Red Cross leader, born in Bangor
 Mabel Sine Wadsworth (1910–2006), birth control activist

Politicians 

 John Baldacci, former Governor of Maine and United States Representative, was born in Bangor
 John H. Carkin, Oregon lawyer and politician, was born in Bangor
 Joseph Homan Manley, protege and close associate of presidential candidate James G. Blaine, was Chairman of the National Executive Committee of the Republican Party in the 1890s, and Maine's "political boss;" he was born in Bangor

Scholars 

 Doris Twitchell Allen (1901–2002), University of Maine psychologist; born in nearby Old Town, and practiced at the Bangor Mental Health Institute in the 1970s, founded the Children's International Summer Villages. She was also President of the International Council of Psychologists
 Winfield Scott Chaplin (1847–1918), grew up in Bangor, became professor of civil engineering at the Imperial University (now Tokyo University) in Japan, and was awarded the Imperial Order of Meiji. He was later appointed Dean of the Lawrence Scientific School at Harvard, and eventually Chancellor of Washington University in St. Louis
 Robert Winslow Gordon, became the first Director of the Archives of the American Folk Song at the Library of Congress. In the 1910s–1930s he was arguably the leading authority on this genre of music, personally recorded nearly a thousand folk songs and transcribing the lyrics of 10,000 more
 John Irwin Hutchinson (1867–1935), became a noted Professor of Mathematics at Cornell University, and Vice President of the American Mathematical Society
 Ella Boyce Kirk (–1930), became Superintendent of Schools in Pittsburgh, one of the first women to hold that office in an American city
 Edith Lesley, founder of Lesley University in Massachusetts; grew up in Bangor
 Sarah Parcak, Bangor-born Egyptologist; of the University of Alabama uses satellite imaging. An earlier archaeologist from Bangor, Henry Williamson Haynes, also did field-work in Egypt
 Albion Woodbury Small, The "Father of American Sociology"; attended grade-school in Bangor. He was the first American professor of sociology, founder of the first dept. of sociology (at the University of Chicago), edited the discipline's first American journal, and was President of the American Sociological Society (1912–1913)
 Harris Hawthorne Wilder (1864–1928), zoologist; born in Bangor
 William D. Williamson, a Brown University-educated Bangor lawyer who became the second Governor of Maine, was also the state's first historian, producing a two-volume History of the State of Maine as early as 1832. It remained the standard reference throughout the 19th century.
 Edwin Young, who graduated from Bangor High School in 1935, became dean of the College of Letters and Science at the University of Wisconsin and president of the University of Maine. He was an economist and expert on international labor relations.

Show business/Entertainment 

 Eugene A. Eberle (1840–1917), broadway actor; made his debut as Paris in a Bangor production of Romeo and Juliet. He played the gravedigger in Edwin Booth's Hamlet in 1864–1865. By the early 1900s he was in the touring company of acclaimed actor Otis Skinner.
 Everett Glass (1891–1966), character actor; was born in Bangor. He appeared in more than eighty films and television shows from the 1940s through the 1960s, including Invasion of the Body Snatchers (1956) and episodes of Superman, Lassie, and Perry Mason.
 Richard Golden (1854–1909), comic stage actor; called by one turn-of-the-century theatre critic "the best character actor in America" is buried at Bangor's Mount Hope Cemetery His wife and partner Dora Wiley, "The Sweet Singer of Maine" was the original prima donna of the Boston Opera Company
 Chris Greeley, featured in 1993 as Cosmopolitan magazine's Bachelor-of-the-Month. As a result, he appeared on multiple TV shows, including ones hosted by John Tesh and Leeza Gibbons, in addition to Carnie Wilson and Sally Jesse Raphael. Greeley also served four terms in the Maine Legislature
 Leonard Horn (1926–1975), directed episodes of 34 prime-time television series and a number of made-for-TV movies between 1959 and 1975, including Mission: Impossible, Mannix, It Takes a Thief, Voyage to the Bottom of the Sea, The Outer Limits, and Lost in Space.
 Bob Marley, comedian; born and raised in Bangor, has appeared on the Late Show with David Letterman, The Tonight Show with Jay Leno, and Late Night with Conan O'Brien as well as Comedy Central and cult film "The Boondock Saints"
 Wayne Maunder, actor; played George Armstrong Custer in the series Custer on ABC in 1967, and co-starred with Andrew Duggan, James Stacy, and Paul Brinegar on CBS's Lancer western series, was reared in Bangor though born in New Brunswick, Canada
 Stephanie Niznik, actress; of the television series Everwood and the film Star Trek: Insurrection was also reared in Bangor
 Priscilla Presley, actress and businesswoman; lived briefly in Bangor
 Charles Rocket (1949–2005), comedian/actor; cast member on Saturday Night Live, and appeared in more than eighty other television shows and films, including Touched by an Angel, Miami Vice, and Star Trek: Voyager
 Eric Saindon, visual effects supervisor for the films King Kong and Night at the Museum, and a key member of the visual effects team of I, Robot and The Lord of the Rings film trilogy.  He is a three-time winner of the Visual Effects Society Award  A second visual effects man from Bangor, Christopher Mills, has contributed to such films as Evan Almighty, The Golden Compass, and Night at the Museum
 Ralph Sipperly (–1928), appeared in ten films between 1923 and 1932, most of them silent, including the Academy Award winning Sunrise: A Song of Two Humans. He died in Bangor and is buried at Mount Hope Cemetery
 Gary Thorne, sportscaster; born here and once served as an assistant district attorney in the city

Singers, musicians and songwriters 

 Norman Cazden, celebrated composer (and collector of folk songs); victim of McCarthyism in the 1950s, taught at the nearby University of Maine from 1969 and died in Bangor in 1980
 Dick Curless, country singer; recorded the 1965 hit Tombstone Every Mile, also lived there
 Howie Day, singer-songwriter; recorded the hit "Collide", was born in Bangor, and got his start playing local clubs
 Kay Gardner (1941–2002), flutist and pioneering composer of 'healing music' lived and died in Bangor
 R. B. Hall, conductor of the Bangor Band, became an internationally famous composer of marches. His 'Death or Glory' remains a march classic in the UK and Commonwealth counties
 Sarah Robinson-Duff (died 1934), soprano and famous voice teacher
 George Frederick Root (1820–1895), noted American Civil War era composer of songs such as The Battle Cry of Freedom, lived in Bangor before becoming a successful music publisher in Chicago
 Werner Torkanowsky, Berlin-born; director of the New Orleans Symphony Orchestra, came to Bangor in 1981 to direct the Bangor Symphony and did so until his death in 1992
 Johnny Williams, father of film composer John Williams lived there according to his 2022 Lenox Library interview.

Soldiers and sailors 

 Charles A. Boutelle, Naval Lt. that accepted the surrender of the Confederate fleet after the Battle of Mobile Bay, where he commanded an ironclad. Another Bangor sailor, Thomas Taylor received the Congressional Medal of Honor for bravery in the same battle. Boutelle became a long-serving U.S. Congressman and proponent of American naval power. Boutelle Ave. in Bangor is named for him
 George Adams Bright, Rear Admiral; surgeon and Medical Director of the Naval Hospital in Washington, D.C.
 Joshua Chamberlain, Major General and hero of the Battle of Gettysburg who also accepted the surrender of General Lee's Army at Appomattox, was born in the neighboring city of Brewer but studied at the Bangor Theological Seminary. The bridge connecting the two cities is named for him. Chamberlain, a professor at Bowdoin College when the war began, and later its president, could read seven foreign languages. He was also elected Governor of Maine, as was another Civil War general from Bangor, Harris Merrill Plaisted. Cyrus Hamlin, who commanded a regiment of African-American troops, and Charles Hamlin, both sons of Vice President Hannibal Hamlin, also became generals in the Civil War. Other Bangorians who achieved a general's rank in the same conflict included Edward Hatch, who commanded the cavalry division of Grant's Army of the Tennessee; Charles W. Roberts; George Varney; John F. Appleton and Daniel White. Col. Daniel Chaplin, who died in battle, was posthumously made a Maj. General. Brig. Gen. George Foster Shepley became the military governor of Louisiana, and later of Richmond, Virginia, the former Confederate capitol
 Carl Frederick Holden, Vice Admiral that began World War II as executive officer of the battleship  during the attack on Pearl Harbor. He became the first captain of the battleship , and ended the war as a Rear Adm. commanding Cruiser Division Pacific.
 Molly Kool (1916–2009), first registered female sea captain in North America, spent the last years of her life in Bangor
 Walter F. Ulmer, Lt. General; former Commandant of Cadets at West Point and commander of the III Corps and Fort Hood
 Donald Norton Yates, Lt. General; helped select June 6, 1944 as the date for D-Day, the Allied invasion of Europe, in his capacity as chief meteorologist on General Dwight D. Eisenhower's staff. He chose well—it turned out to be the only day that month the invasion could have been successfully launched—and was subsequently decorated by three governments. He went on to become the chief meteorologist of the U.S. Air Force, Commander of the Air Force Missile Test Center at Patrick Air Force Base in Florida, and retired as Deputy Director of Defence Research and Engineering in the Pentagon
 Elmer P. Yates, Major General; early proponent of nuclear power in the U.S. Army Corps of Engineers

Statesmen 

 Elisha Hunt Allen (1841–1843), US congress
 Jack Backman, congress (Massachusetts)
 John Baldacci (1995–2003), US congress; Governor of Maine
 Mark Alton Barwise, only elected member of the Spiritualist religion known to have achieved statewide office in the United States: attorney who served in the Maine House of Representatives, and then the Maine State Senate, in 1921–1926. Barwise was a trustee (and senior counsel) of the National Spiritualist Association and Curator of its Bureau of Phenomenal Evidence. He also wrote prolifically on Spiritualism
 David Augustus Boody, congress (New York, and Mayor of Brooklyn)
 Charles A. Boutelle (1882–1901), US congress; was Chairman of the House Committee on Naval Affairs during the building of the Great White Fleet
 Francis Carr (1812–1813), US congress
 James Carr (1815–1817), US congress
 William Cohen, former U.S. Senator and United States Secretary of Defense under President Bill Clinton, is a Bangor native. A local middle school is named in his honor
 Susan Collins, current Republican U.S. Senator; lives in Bangor and is the longest serving member of congress
 Solomon Comstock, congress (Minnesota)
 Sean Faircloth, Five-term state legislator, author and attorney; as of 2016 Faircloth is serving as mayor of Bangor. Faircloth has represented the Richard Dawkins Foundation and has served as the Executive Director of the Secular Coalition for America from 2009–2011
 Alpheus Felch, congress (Michigan)
 Frank Fellows (1941–1951), US congress
 Loren Fletcher, congress (Minnesota)
 Hannibal Hamlin, who served as Abraham Lincoln's first Vice President, and was a strong opponent of slavery. His statue stands in a downtown park, and his house is on the National Register of Historic Places. His daughter and son were present in Ford's Theatre the night Lincoln was shot. Lincoln's Secretary of the Treasury, William P. Fessenden, practiced law in Bangor in the early 1830s
 Samuel F. Hersey (1873–1875), US congress; Hersey willed his estate to the City of Bangor, which used it to found the Bangor Public Library in 1883
 Daniel T. Jewett, congress (Missouri)
 George W. Ladd (1879–1883), US congress
 Patricia LaMarche, vice presidential candidate of the Green Party in the 2004 election, was raised in Bangor
 John R. McKernan (1983–1987), US congress; Governor of Maine
 Donald C. McRuer, congress (California)
 Orrin Larrabee Miller, congress (Kansas)
 Dorilus Morrison, the first mayor of Minneapolis, was a Bangor lumber merchant in the 1840s Amos Curry became the Reconstruction-era sheriff of Shelby County, Tennessee (Memphis).
 Gorham Parks (1833–1837), US congress
 John A. Peters (1822–1904), US congress
 Harris M. Plaisted (1875–1877), US congress; Governor of Maine
 Donald F. Snow (1929–1933), US congress; Snow was sentenced to two years in prison for embezzlement in 1935, but was pardoned a few months later
 Charles Stetson (1849–1851), US congress
 Frederick Stevens, congress (Minnesota)
 Abner Taylor, congress (Illinois)
 Mark Trafton, congress (Massachusetts)
 Gerald E. Talbot, first African-American elected to the Maine State Legislature was Bangor-born who served 1972–1978
 John G. Utterback (1933–1935), US congress
 William D. Washburn, congress (Minnesota)
 William D. Williamson (1821–1823), US congress; Governor of Maine

Other 

 Holland "Holly" Hanson Coors (1920–2009), beer baroness and political donor was born in Bangor. The ex-wife of Joseph Coors, Colorado brewer and founder of the Heritage Foundation, Holly Coors sat on that organization's board of trustees
 Bettina Brown Gorton, wife of Australian Prime Minister Sir John Gorton (who served 1968–1971) was from Bangor and graduated from Bangor High School. She was the only wife of an Australian Prime Minister to have been foreign-born until Annita van Iersel, wife of Paul Keating (who served 1991–1996). She became Lady Gorton when her husband was knighted in 1977
 Abby Fisher Leavitt (1836–1897), social reformer
 Corelli C. W. Simpson (1837–1923), American poet, cookbook author, painter; opened the first kindergarten in Bangor

References

Bangor, Maine
Bangor, Maine